The Great Defender is a 1934 British mystery film directed by Thomas Bentley and starring Matheson Lang, Margaret Bannerman and Arthur Margetson. Its plot concerns a top barrister who conducts the defence of an artist facing the death penalty for allegedly murdering his model, while himself battling with serious illness.

Cast
 Matheson Lang - Sir Douglas Rolls 
 Margaret Bannerman - Laura Locke 
 Arthur Margetson - Leslie Locke 
 Richard Bird - Eric Hammond 
 Sam Livesey - Sir Henry Linguard 
 Frank Atkinson - Pope 
 Hal Gordon - Percival Brown 
 Kathleen Harrison - Agnes Carter - Locke's Maid 
 Robert Horton - Doctor Hackett 
 Alec Fraser - Grainger 
 Jeanne Stuart - Phyllis Ware 
 J. Fisher White - Judge 
 Laurence Hanray - Parker 
 O. B. Clarence - Mr. Hammond 
 Mary Jerrold - Mrs. Hammond
 Jimmy Godden - Inspector Holmes

References

External links

1934 films
1930s English-language films
British mystery films
British legal films
Films shot at Welwyn Studios
Films set in England
Films set in London
Films directed by Thomas Bentley
British black-and-white films
1930s British films